"What Makes a Good Man?" is a song by English rock band The Heavy. It was released as the lead single from their third studio album, The Glorious Dead, on 23 May 2012. A music video for the song was also released on Vevo and YouTube on 21 August 2012. The song peaked at number 127 on the French Singles Chart. The song was also used during the credits sequence in the video game Borderlands: The Pre-Sequel. and a Russian television commercial for the Volkswagen Teramont. Since March 2018 it is also the theme song for the German late night show Late Night Berlin. It was also used as the theme song for WWE's PPV event Royal Rumble in January of 2013.

Music video
The official music video for the song, lasting three minutes and twenty-one seconds, was uploaded on 21 August 2012 to the band's Vevo channel on YouTube.

Track listing

7" vinyls
 Counter — COUNT044 A/B (Green vinyl)

 Counter — COUNT044 C (Orange vinyl)

Promo CD
 Counter — COUNTCD044P

Charts

References

2012 singles
The Heavy (band) songs
2012 songs